Salmanlı (also, Mashad-Salmanly and Salmanly) is a village and municipality in the Sabirabad Rayon of Azerbaijan.  It has a population of 765.

References 

Populated places in Sabirabad District